Peru Olympic football team (also known as Peru under-23, Peru U23) represents Peru in international football competitions in multi-sport events such as the Olympic Games and the Pan American Games. The selection is limited to players under the age of 23, except three overage players. The team is controlled by the Peruvian Football Federation (FPF).
Peru has participated in two Olympic football tournaments, one Pan American football tournament, and 7 Bolivarian football tournaments under this category.

The squad requirements to participate in the Summer Olympics has changed multiple times through the history of the competition. Since 1992, squads for Football at the Summer Olympics have been restricted to three players over the age of 23 with similar changes occurring in the Pan American Games in 1999. The achievements of such teams are not usually included in the statistics of the international team.

History

1936 Summer Olympics

Peru qualified the Olympics for its first time in 1936, after finishing third in the 1935 South American Championship. Argentina and Uruguay, who had finished ahead, refuse to participate because of economic issues.

Among the line of players featured in this first participation of the Blanquirroja were Alejandro Villanueva, Teodoro Fernández, Juan Valdivieso, and Adelfo Magallanes. The Peruvian players, after arriving in Germany via an Italian ship, were awestruck by the modern stadiums and the German idolatry of Adolf Hitler. The first match against Finland was played on 6 August 1936, and was won with great ease by the Peruvians with a 7-3 result. Peru's next match was against Austria in the quarterfinals. The match was highly contested, and the game went into overtime where the Peruvians tied against the Austrians after being two goals behind. Peru scored 5 goals during overtime, of which 3 were nullified by the referee, and won by a final score of 4-2.

The Austrians demanded a rematch on the grounds that Peruvian fans had stormed the field, and because the field did not meet the requirements for a football game. Austria further claimed that the Peruvian players had manhandled the Austrian players and that spectators, one holding a revolver, had "swarmed down on the field." Peru was notified of this situation, and they attempted to go to the assigned meeting but were delayed by a German parade. At the end, the Peruvian defense was never heard, and the Olympic Committee and FIFA sided with the Austrians. The rematch was scheduled to be taken under close grounds on 10 August, and later rescheduled to be taken on 11 August.

As a sign of protest against these actions, which the Peruvians deemed as insulting and discriminatory, the complete Olympic delegations of Peru and Colombia left Germany. Argentina, Chile, Uruguay, and Mexico expressed their solidarity with Peru. Michael Dasso, a member of the Peruvian Olympic Committee, stated: "We've no faith in European athletics. We have come here and found a bunch of merchants." The game was awarded to Austria by default. In Peru, angry crowds protested against the decisions of the Olympic Committee by tearing down an Olympic flag, throwing stones at the German consulate, refusing to load German vessels in the docks of Callao, and listening to inflammatory speeches which included President Oscar Benavides Larrea's mention of "the crafty Berlin decision." To this day, it is not known with certainty what exactly happened in Germany, but it is popularly believed that Adolf Hitler and the Nazi authorities might have had some involvement in the situation.

1960 Summer Olympics

After 24 years, Peru once again qualified for the football tournament at the 1960 Summer Olympics held in Rome with their U-23 football team. It defeated Uruguay in the two-leg play-off round by 6-0 in Lima and then by 3-2 in Montevideo. The five play-off winners faced each other in a special tournament held in Lima in April 1960. Los Incas finished third ahead of Mexico and Suriname and thus qualified for the tournament in Rome.

In their first match of the tournament, Peru started out with a surprise as Angel Uribe scored a 1st-minute goal against France. Peru would go on to lose 2-1 against the French, and were later beaten by Hungary in a result of 6-2, with only Alberto Ramírez scoring goals for the Blanquirroja. Their last match was against India, which was a comfortable 3-1 score in favor of the Peruvians with goals by Nicolas Nieri and Thomas Iwasaki.

Peru has not qualified again to the tournament since 1960, but were close to qualifying again in the 1964 and 1980 CONMEBOL Men Pre-Olympic Tournaments.

2015 Pan American Games

An official multi-sport event squad was created once again for the first time since the 1960 Summer Olympics in 2015 for Peru's first participation in the Pan American football tournament held in Canada. Peru had qualified to this tournament once before in 2007. CONMEBOL only accepted to play with Under-17 teams that year (qualified through the 2007 South American Under-17 Football Championship), since the Under-20 teams had to participate in the U-20 World Cup at the same time. Peru declined to participate because the Under-17 team preferred to play friendlies in Asia in preparation of the U-17 World Cup, so Bolivia took its place.

Thus Peru qualified once again in 2015 via the 2015 South American U-20 Championship. That year the top three teams in the final stage of the tournament qualified to the 2016 Olympic tournament and the bottom three to the 2015 Pan American tournament of which Peru finished 5th.

The team's first game was against Panama on July 12. Panama put themselves ahead via Jorman Aguilar at the beginning of the first half. Peru then equalized the score through a goal by Gonzalo Maldonado twelve minutes later. The deadlock was broken in the 90th minute when Elsar Rodas committed a foul against the Panamanian Cecilio Waterman who was awarded a penalty that was converted by Fidel Escobar for a final score of 2–1. The second game was against Brazil with a final score of 4–0 with goals of Luan, Clayton, Rômulo, and Dodô. This was enough to mathematically eliminate Peru out of the tournament before its third game against Canada. During that game Elsar Rodas scored the first and then Manjrekar James scored an own goal in the second half for a final 0–2 against the locals.

2019 Pan American Games

Peru qualified to the 2019 tournament as host. It lost its first game by 2–0 against Uruguay. Peru's second game was against Honduras who scored two goals in injury time of the game for a 2–2 draw. Peru's two goals were scored by Kevin Quevedo and Jordan Guivin. On the last match day, Uruguay defeated Honduras by 3–0 which would qualify Peru the second round of the tournament if it was able to defeat Jamaica. In the end Jamaica defeated Peru with two goals in the second half, relegating Peru to the 7th place match against Ecuador. There, a final score of 1–1 forced both teams to decide the match in penalties which Peru won by 4–2 to finish 7th of eight teams.

Bolivarian Games
The Bolivarian Games (Spanish: Juegos Bolivarianos) are a regional multi-sport event held in honor of Simón Bolívar, and organized by the Bolivarian Sports Organization (Organización Deportiva Bolivariana, ODEBO). The games' football tournament has changed category multiple times during the history of the competition with full national teams participating
only on the first edition in 1938. At times the competition was limited to only amateur sides or youth teams. In 1985 the tournament was played by Under-20 sides. Since 1993 the football tournament is played by U-17 national teams.

Peru won the first tournament which it counts as part of the accomplishments of the senior team. Because of the many changes, all of Peru's accomplishment since then until 1981 are counted as accomplishments of the Olympic team.

Players

Current
The following 21 players have been called up for the friendly match against Chile on 31 August 2022.

Players born on or after 1 January 2001 were eligible, except for two overage players who are denoted with a *. Only defender Renzo Garcés has appearances with the Peru's senior team.

Recent 
The players listed below were not included in the current squad, but have been called up by Peru in the last 12 months.
Overage players are denoted with a *

INJ Withdrew due to injury
PRE Preliminary squad
SUS Suspended
WD Withdrew from the squad

Honours
 CONMEBOL Pre-Olympic Tournament:
 Runners-up (1): 1960
 Third place (2): 1964, 1980
 Fourth place (1): 1971
 South American Games:
  Gold Medalists (1): 1990
  Bronze Medalists (2): 1983, 1994
 Bolivarian Games:
  Gold Medalists (6): 1938, 1947-48, 1961, 1973, 1981, 2001
  Silver Medalists (1): 1997
  Bronze Medalists (4): 1951, 1977, 1985, 2013

Results and fixtures

Competitive record

See also
Peru national football team
Peru national under-20 football team
Peru national under-17 football team

References

Under23
South American national under-23 association football teams
South American Olympic national association football teams